KMJ may refer to:

 KMJ (AM), a radio station (580 AM) licensed to serve Fresno, California, United States
 KMJ-FM, a radio station (105.9 FM) licensed to serve Fresno, California
 KSEE, formerly KMJ-TV (1953–1981), Fresno, California
 Kumamoto Airport IATA code